Cleisostoma williamsoni (common names: Williamson's cleisostom, in China: hong hua ge ju lan) is a species of orchid. It is found in Asia.

References

External links 
 Cleisostoma williamsoni at the Plant List

williamsoni
Orchids of Bhutan
Plants described in 1972